Prapanchan, is the pseudonym of S. Vaidyalingam (27 April 1945 – 21 December 2018) a Tamil, writer and critic from Puducherry, India.

Biography
Prapanchan was born in Pondicherry and did his schooling in Petit Seminaire Higher Secondary School, Puducherry. His birth name was Vaidyalingam. His father ran a toddy shop. He attended the Karandhai College and graduated as a Tamil Vidwan. He started his career as a Tamil teacher in Thanjavur. He also worked as a journalist in Kumudam, Ananda Vikatan and Kungumam. In 1961, he published his first short story Enna ulagamada in the magazine Bharani. He was influenced by the Self-Respect Movement. He had published 46 books. In 1995, he was awarded the Sahitya Akademi Award for Tamil for his historical novel Vaanam Vasappadum (lit. The Sky will be ours) set in the times of Ananda Ranga Pillai. His works have been translated into Hindi, Telugu, Kannada, German, French, English and Swedish. His play Muttai is part of the curriculum in Delhi University and his short story collection Netrru Manidhargal is a textbook in many colleges. He was married to Pramila Rani and they have three sons. He was living in Chennai and Pondicherry. He was diagnosed with lung cancer (Squamous cell carcinoma), for which he underwent palliative chemotherapy from Manakula Vinayagar Medical College & Hospital under the department of pulmonary medicine and oncology. On 21 December 2018 he died of respiratory failure and tumor metastasis.

Partial bibliography

Novels
Vaanam vasappadum
Mahanadhi
 Manudam vellum
Sandhya
Kagidha Manidhargal
Kaneeral Kappom
Penmai velga
Padhavi
Erodu Thamizhar uyirodu

Novellas
Aangalum Pengalum

Short story collections
Nerru Manidhargal
Vittu Viduthalayagi
Iruttin Vaasal
Oru ooril irandu manidhargal
  Appavin veshti 
 Mari engira aatukutti

Plays
Muttai
Akalya

Awards and recognitions
Sahitya Akademi Award in Tamil, 1996 for Vaanam vasappadum
Bharatiya Bhasha Parishad Award
Coimbatore Kasturi Rangammal Award for Mahanadhi
Ilakkiya Chinthanai Award for Manudam vellum
Adithanar award for Sandhya
Award for Non-Fiction from The Tamil Literary Garden, Toronto

References

External links

1945 births
2018 deaths
Novelists from Puducherry
Recipients of the Sahitya Akademi Award in Tamil
Tamil writers
Indian Tamil people
People from Pondicherry
20th-century Indian dramatists and playwrights
20th-century Indian novelists
20th-century Indian short story writers